Beugnâtre is a commune in the Pas-de-Calais department in the Hauts-de-France region in northern France.

Geography
A small farming village located 15 miles (24 km) southeast of Arras at the junction of the D956 and D10E  roads. The A1 autoroute passes by just yards from the commune.

Population

Sights
 The church of St. Leger, rebuilt, like most of the village, after the ravages of World War I.

See also
Communes of the Pas-de-Calais department

References

Communes of Pas-de-Calais